Jobcase, Inc is a technology and AI company that provides a job marketplace and social platform. 

Their platform, Jobcase.com, launched in 2015, applying "machine-learning algorithms" with a "mission to serve people who were overlooked by traditional job websites." The platform includes group hubs, hiring tips, profiles for work history, endorsements, and integration with job search services such as GlassDoor, Indeed, and CareerBuilder. They also launched the Jobcase mobile app which is available on iOS and Android.

Jobcase is an affiliate of MIT's Computer Science and Artificial Intelligence Laboratory (CSAIL).


History
 In March 2016. Jobcase reported 50 million members.
 In February 2017, Jobcase reported 70 million members.
 In November 2018, Jobcase reported 90 million members.
 In February 2019, Jobcase reported 100 million registered users and 25 million unique active visitors each month.
 In April 2022, Jobcase reported 130 million registered users.

Funding
The company has raised a total of US$118.9 Million:
 In 2017, Jobcase raised $7 Million USD in venture capital in a Series A funding round.
 In 2019, a $100M growth equity round was led by Providence Strategic Growth.

References

External links
Official Website

Business services companies established in 2015
Internet properties established in 2015
Recruit (company)
Employment websites in the United States
Companies based in Cambridge, Massachusetts
2015 establishments in Massachusetts
Employment social networks